Laura Sárosi (born 11 November 1992) is a Hungarian badminton player who competed at the 2016 Summer Olympics held in Rio de Janeiro, Brazil.

2016 European Championships 
During the 2016 European Championships held in France, Sárosi was eliminated in the second round. She beat Croatian Dorotea Sutara 21–8, 21–5 in the first round, before losing to Karin Schnaase of Germany, 21–16, 14–21, 18–21. During the match, Sárosi loaned her spare shoes to her opponent, after one of Schnaase's own shoes had fallen apart during the first set. The result meant that Sárosi did not gain enough ranking points to qualify directly for the 2016 Summer Olympics and was instead named as the second reserve. Sárosi was later given a place in the Games after unused Tripartite Commission wildcards were reallocated.

Achievements

BWF International Challenge/Series (10 titles, 6 runners-up) 
Women's singles

Women's doubles

  BWF International Challenge tournament
  BWF International Series tournament
  BWF Future Series tournament

References

External links 
 
 
 
 
 

1992 births
Living people
Sportspeople from Budapest
Hungarian female badminton players
Badminton players at the 2016 Summer Olympics
Olympic badminton players of Hungary
Badminton players at the 2015 European Games
European Games competitors for Hungary
Badminton players at the 2020 Summer Olympics